This is a list of people elected Fellow of the Royal Society in 1916.

Fellows 
Edwin Henry Barton
William Robert Bousfield
Sidney George Brown
Ernest George Coker
George Gerald Henderson
John Edensor Littlewood
John Alexander MacWilliam
Joseph Henry Maiden
Alexander McKenzie
Henry Harold Welch Pearson
James Arthur Pollock
Sir Leonard Rogers
Cresswell Shearer
Sir D'Arcy Wentworth Thompson
Henry Woods

Foreign members

Jules Jean Baptiste Vincent Bordet
Boris Borisovich Golitsyn
Johan Hjort
Charles Louis Alphonse Laveran
Heike Kamerlingh Onnes

1916
1916 in the United Kingdom
1916 in science